The Queen + Adam Lambert Tour 2014–2015 was a worldwide concert tour by British rock band Queen and American singer Adam Lambert during 2014 and 2015. Following on their 2012 tour and their appearance at the 2013 iHeart Radio Music Festival, the band announced a 2014 tour of North America. Following the overwhelming success of their North American tour, it was expanded to Australia, New Zealand and Asia in the autumn, then Europe in early 2015. A tour of South America took place in September 2015.

According to Pollstar, the complete tour 2014–2015 grossed $68.7 million, ranked number 35 in the top 100 worldwide tours in 2014  and number 46 in 2015.

Background

Queen + Adam Lambert first toured together in 2012. The following year, 2013, Queen and Lambert only performed one concert together at the MGM Grand Garden Arena. This concert was part of the iHeartRadio Music Festival. The band were joined onstage by American band Fun for several songs. The concert was met by positive reviews.

On 6 March 2014 Queen and Lambert announced at a press conference in the United States and via QueenOnline that they would tour North America in June and July 2014 starting in Chicago including concerts at the legendary venue Madison Square Garden in New York and at The Forum in Los Angeles where the band had last performed in 1982. The tour began with an intimate performance at the iHeartRadio Theater in Los Angeles.

On 2 April it was announced that Queen would play in South Korea for the first time in their careers at the Super Sonic Festival. On the same day it was announced that Queen and Lambert would play at the same festival franchise in Japan. The last time Queen played in Japan was with Paul Rodgers eight years previously.

On 19 May it was announced that Queen and Lambert would play several shows in Australia. This was the first time that Queen had played in the country since 1985, twenty-nine years previously. Queen and Lambert were to perform one show each in Perth, Sydney, Melbourne and Brisbane. On 26 May a second date at Melbourne's Rod Laver Arena was added. The following day a second date at Sydney's Allphones Arena was added. On 16 July a concert at Auckland's Vector Arena was announced. A week later a second concert at the Vector Arena was announced. On 29 September 2014, Queen and Lambert announced a European leg of the tour, including two concerts at The O2 in London on 17 and 18 January 2015.

Three special performances were played for X FACTOR UK, Helene Fischer Show on 25 December 2014, & New Year's Eve at Westminster Hall where they played Drowse for the first time at the rehearsals, London  on 31 December 2014. The 85,000 tickets for each night of Rock In Rio sold out in just 3 hours.

Lady Gaga performed with Lambert and Queen singing Another One Bites The Dust during their stop in Sydney.

Set lists
{{hidden
| headercss = background: #ccccff; font-size: 100%; width: 75%;
| contentcss = text-align: left; font-size: 100%; width: 75%;
| header = North American set list
| content =
"Procession (tape)"
"Now I'm Here"
"Stone Cold Crazy"
"Another One Bites the Dust"
"Fat Bottomed Girls"
"In the Lap of the Gods... Revisited"
"Seven Seas of Rhye"
"Killer Queen"
"Somebody to Love"
"I Want It All"
"Love of My Life"
"39"
"These Are the Days of Our Lives"
"Bass Solo"
"Drum Battle"
"Under Pressure"
"Love Kills"
"Who Wants to Live Forever"
"Last Horizon"
"Guitar Solo"
"Tie Your Mother Down"
"All Your Love Tonight"
"Radio Ga Ga"
"Crazy Little Thing Called Love"
"The Show Must Go On"
"Bohemian Rhapsody"
Encore:
"We Will Rock You"
"We Are the Champions"
"God Save the Queen (tape)"
Other Songs:
"Don't Stop Me Now" was played at most shows in June after "Radio Ga Ga"
"Dragon Attack" replaced "Love Kills" at the last two shows
"Bass Solo" and "Vocal Solo" were not played in Chicago
}}
{{hidden
| headercss = background: #ccccff; font-size: 100%; width: 75%;
| contentcss = text-align: left; font-size: 100%; width: 75%;
| header = Asian and Oceanic set list
| content =
"Procession (tape)"
"Now I'm Here"
"Stone Cold Crazy"
"Another One Bites the Dust"
"Fat Bottomed Girls"
"In the Lap of the Gods... Revisited"
"Seven Seas of Rhye"
"Killer Queen"
"Somebody to Love"
"I Want It All"
"Love of My Life"
"39"
"A Kind of Magic"
"Bass Solo"
"Drum Battle"
"Under Pressure"
"Dragon Attack"
"Who Wants to Live Forever"
"Last Horizon"
"Guitar Solo"
"Tie Your Mother Down"
"All Your Love Tonight"
"Radio Ga Ga"
"Crazy Little Thing Called Love"
"Bohemian Rhapsody"
Encore:
"We Will Rock You"
"We Are the Champions"
"God Save the Queen (tape)"
Other Songs:
"Teo Torriatte (Let Us Cling Together)" was added for the two Japanese shows before "Love of My Life", performed in the acoustic set by Brian
"I Was Born to Love You" was performed after "Dragon Attack" in South Korea and "Radio Ga Ga" in Japan
"I Want to Break Free" was added in Australia and New Zealand
"The Show Must Go On" was added in Melbourne on 30 August before "Bohemian Rhapsody"
"Waltzing Matilda" was added in Brisbane before "Love of My Life", performed in the acoustic set by Brian
"Don't Dream It's Over" was added at the second New Zealand show, again performed in the acoustic set by Brian
}}
{{hidden
| headercss = background: #ccccff; font-size: 100%; width: 75%;
| contentcss = text-align: left; font-size: 100%; width: 75%;
| header = UK and European set list
| content =
"One Vision"
"Stone Cold Crazy"
"Another One Bites the Dust"
"Fat Bottomed Girls"
"In the Lap of the Gods... Revisited"
"Seven Seas of Rhye"
"Killer Queen"
"I Want to Break Free"
"Somebody to Love"
"Love of My Life"
"39"
"These Are the Days of Our Lives"
"A Kind of Magic"
"Bass Solo"
"Drum Battle"
"Under Pressure"
"Save Me"
"Who Wants to Live Forever"
"Last Horizon"
"Guitar Solo"
"Tie Your Mother Down"
"All Your Love Tonight"
"I Want It All"
"Radio Ga Ga"
"Crazy Little Thing Called Love"
"Bohemian Rhapsody"
Encore:
"We Will Rock You"
"We Are the Champions"
"God Save the Queen (tape)"
Other Songs:
"Drowse" was played at the soundcheck in London for the New Year's Show, but they never played it on the tour
"Fog on the Tyne" was played in Newcastle
"Maybe It's Because I'm a Londoner" was played at The O2 in London on the first night 
"The Show Must Go On" was performed at some shows
"Plaisir d'amour" was played in Paris
"Don't Stop Me Now" was only performed in the UK
"Stone Cold Crazy" was not performed in Cologne and Amsterdam
"Who Wants to Live Forever" was not performed in Frankfurt
"Another One Bites the Dust" was not performed in Milan
"Dragon Attack" was performed in Kraków and at Wembley before "I Want It All"
"You've Got to Hide Your Love Away" was played in Liverpool
}}
{{hidden
| headercss = background: #ccccff; font-size: 100%; width: 75%;
| contentcss = text-align: left; font-size: 100%; width: 75%;
| header = South American set list
| content =
"One Vision"
"Stone Cold Crazy"
"Another One Bites the Dust"
"Fat Bottomed Girls"
"In the Lap of the Gods... Revisited"
"Seven Seas of Rhye"
"Killer Queen"
"Don't Stop Me Now"
"I Want to Break Free"
"Somebody to Love"
"Love of My Life"
"39"
"These Are the Days of Our Lives"
"Bass Solo"
"Drum Battle"
"Under Pressure"
"Save Me"
"Ghost Town"
"Who Wants to Live Forever"
"Last Horizon"
"Guitar Solo"
"Tie Your Mother Down"
"All Your Love Tonight"
"I Want It All"
"Radio Ga Ga"
"Crazy Little Thing Called Love"
"The Show Must Go On"
"Bohemian Rhapsody"
Encore:
"We Will Rock You"
"We Are the Champions"
"God Save the Queen (tape)"
Other Songs:
"'39", "Bass Solo" and "Tie Your Mother Down" weren't performed at Rock in Rio. 
"The Show Must Go On" was moved to after the guitar solo at Rock in Rio.
"A Kind of Magic" was performed instead of "These Are the Days of Our Lives" at Rock in Rio.
"Las Palabras de Amor" was played in place of "'39" in Argentina.
The band rehearsed "Let Me Entertain You" in soundchecks before the final show of South America – though it was never performed on tour.
"Stone Cold Crazy" wasn't performed in Santiago.}}

Tour dates
List of concerts, showing date, city, country, venue, tickets sold, number of available tickets, and gross revenue

Cancelled dates

Tour band
Brian May – electric and acoustic guitars, backing vocals, lead vocals on "Love of My Life", "'39" "Teo Torriate (Let Us Cling Together)" and "Las Palabras de Amor (The Words of Love)" and co-lead vocals on "I Want It All"
Roger Taylor – drums, percussion, backing vocals, lead vocals on "These Are the Days of Our Lives" and "A Kind of Magic" and co-lead vocals on "Under Pressure"
Adam Lambert – lead vocals 
Freddie Mercury – vocals (pre-recorded on "Love of My Life" and "Bohemian Rhapsody")

Additional musicians: 
Spike Edney – keyboards, backing vocals 
Neil Fairclough – bass guitars, electric upright bass, backing vocals 
Rufus Tiger Taylor – percussion, additional drums, backing vocals

Notes

References

External links
QueenOnline – Queen's official website.
Adam Lambert – Adam Lambert's official website.

2014 concert tours
2015 concert tours
Queen + Adam Lambert concert tours